Miroslav "Muta" Nikolić (born 8 January 1956) is a Serbian professional basketball coach and former player.

Playing career 
Nikolić played professional basketball for KK Goša from Smederevska Palanka, OKK Beograd, Vršac, IMT, Maribor and Radnički Kragujevac.

Coaching career
Nikolić started his coaching career in 1990. He coached Maribor, Radnički Kragujevac (est. 1950), IMT Beograd, BFC Beočin, Partizan, Budućnost, Crvena zvezda, NIS Vojvodina, Apollon Patras, Hemofarm, Avtodor Saratov, Radnički Kragujevac (est. 2009) and Dynamic.

National team coaching career
Nikolić was an assistant coach of Yugoslavia national team under Željko Obradović between 1996 and 1998. He won the silver medal at the 1996 Summer Olympics in Atlanta and, two gold medals later, at the 1997 European Championship in Spain and the 1998 FIBA World Championship in Greece.

In 2006, Nikolić was the head coach of the Serbia and Montenegro under-20 national team, with whom he won a gold medal at the 2006 FIBA Europe Under-20 Championship in Turkey. In 2007, he was the head coach of the Serbia under-19 national team, with whom he won a gold medal at the 2007 FIBA Under-19 World Championship in Serbia.

Between 2014 and 2019, Nikolić was an assistant coach of Serbia national team under Aleksandar Đorđević. He also has two silver medals from the 2014 FIBA Basketball World Cup in Spain and 2016 Summer Olympics in Rio de Janeiro.

Administrative career
In July 2018, Nikolić became a sporting director for Dynamic BG, where he previously had served as the head coach. He left the spot in May 2019.

Career achievements 
As head coach
 YUBA League champion: 3  (with Partizan: 1996–97, and with Budućnost: 1998–99, 1999–2000)
 Serbian League Cup winner: 2  (with Dynamic BG: 2016–17, and with Vojvodina: 2020–21)

As national team assistant coach
1996 Summer Olympics: 
1997 FIBA European Championship: 
1998 FIBA World Championship: 
2014 FIBA Basketball World Cup: 
2016 Summer Olympics: 
2017 Eurobasket:

See also 
 List of KK Crvena zvezda head coaches
 List of KK Partizan head coaches

References

External links
 Miroslav Nikolić at euroleague.net
 Miroslav Nikolić at kkradnicki.rs

1956 births
Living people
Apollon Patras B.C. coaches
KK BFC coaches
KK Budućnost coaches
KK Crvena zvezda head coaches
KK Dynamic coaches
KK Hemofarm coaches
KK IMT Beograd coaches
KK IMT Beograd players
KK Partizan coaches
KK Radnički Kragujevac (1950–2004) coaches
KK Radnički Kragujevac (2009–2014) coaches
KK Radnički Kragujevac (1950–2004) players
KK Vršac players
OKK Beograd players
BKK Radnički coaches
KK Vojvodina coaches
KK Vojvodina Srbijagas coaches
Sportspeople from Kragujevac
Serbian basketball executives and administrators
Serbian men's basketball coaches
Serbian men's basketball players
Serbian expatriate basketball people in Greece
Serbian expatriate basketball people in Slovenia
Serbian expatriate basketball people in Russia
Serbian expatriate basketball people in Montenegro
Yugoslav basketball coaches
Yugoslav men's basketball players